Lance Everett Olssen (born April 17, 1947) is a former professional American and Canadian football offensive lineman.

Olssen grew up in Staten Island, New York and played high school football for the Stuyvesant High School Peglegs. He played college football at Purdue University as a defensive tackle, wearing the number 75 jersey. In his collegiate playing years, he was the biggest member of the Boilermakers at 6' 5" and 257 pounds and was a member of the team that won the 1967 Rose Bowl when Purdue narrowly defeated USC 14–13. He was honored that same year as an Academic All-American and graduated with bachelor's and master's degrees in industrial management.

The San Francisco 49ers selected Olssen with the 65th overall pick in the 3rd round of the 1968 NFL Draft. As a professional football player, Olssen switched from being a defensive lineman to an offensive lineman. He played two seasons for the San Francisco 49ers from 1968–1969 and one season for the New Orleans Saints in 1970 before playing for the Edmonton Eskimos in the CFL for another two seasons from 1971–1972. In the first of his two seasons with the Eskimos, he had one kickoff return for three yards.

After retirement, Olssen worked as a retail store manager and a circulation manager for the Evansville Courier & Press before retiring in 2004 due to health problems. He lives in Newburgh, Indiana with his wife DeeDee, who was a middle school teacher, and has two sons and two grandchildren.

References

External links
Lance Olssen stats

1947 births
American football offensive linemen
Living people
Edmonton Elks players
New Orleans Saints players
San Francisco 49ers players
Purdue Boilermakers football players
Stuyvesant High School alumni